Alicia Zaban is a footballer who plays as a defender. Born in Canada, she played for the Guyana women's national team.

Club career
Zaban was on the roster for Darby FC in League1 Ontario in 2017, but did not feature in any matches.

International career
Zaban was named to the Guyana national team for the 2018 CONCACAF Women's Championship qualification. She made her debut on May 25 in a 6-1 victory over Suriname.

See also
List of Guyana women's international footballers

References

Living people
Guyanese women's footballers
Women's association football defenders
Guyana women's international footballers
Guyanese expatriate footballers
Guyanese expatriate sportspeople in Canada
Expatriate women's soccer players in Canada
League1 Ontario (women) players
Darby FC players
1999 births